Ryu Tae-joon (born December 7, 1971) is a South Korean actor and singer.

Career 

In April 2017, Ryu signed with new management agency Coridel Entertainment.

Personal life 
In March 2022, Ryu announced that he had been married to his non-celebrity wife for 5 years.

Filmography

Television dramas
 Family Secret (tvN, 2014) - Min Joon-hyuk
 The Noblesse (jTBC, 2014) - Baek Ki-ha
 The Great Seer (SBS, 2012) - King Gongmin
 TV Novel: Dear My Sister (KBS2, 2011-2012) - Kang Joon-mo
 Drama Special "400-year-old Dream" (KBS2, 2011) - Jo Hyun-min / Moo-hyun 
 All About Marriage (KBS2, 2010) - Choi Hyun-wook
 Green Coach (SBS, 2009) - Yoon Hyung-mo
 Working Mom (SBS, 2008) - Ha Jung-won
 Snow in August (SBS, 2007) - Oh Jong-hyuk
 Blue Fish (SBS, 2007) - Park Dong-hyuk
 Crazy in Love (SBS, 2007) - Kang Jae-hoon
 Hwang Jini (KBS2, 2006) - Byuk Kye-soo 
 Love Truly (MBC, 2006) - Kim Joo-yeob

Films
 The Age of Blood (2017) - King Yeongjo
 You're My Pet (2011) - Cha Woo-sung 
 Girl Scout (2008) - Lee Jong-dae

Variety show appearances
 Ya Shim Man Man (July 9, 2007)
 Strong Heart (April 13 & 20, 2010; December 20 & 27, 2011)
 Lord of the Ring (August 20, 2012, pilot episode)
 King of Mask Singer (June 11, 2017, Contestant as "The Dream of The Seagull" on episode 115)

Discography

Awards
2007 SBS Drama Awards - New Star Award

References

External links 
 at Coridel Entertainment

Living people
South Korean male television actors
South Korean male film actors
1974 births
21st-century South Korean male actors